The Stalingrad legal defense is a strategy usually used by a defendant to wear down the plaintiff or legal proceedings by appealing every ruling that is unfavorable to the defendant and using whatever other means possible to delay proceedings. Typically a meritorious case is not presented by the defendant. The term comes from the World War II era Battle of Stalingrad where the Soviet Union won the battle by wearing down attacking German forces over the course of 5 months.

A notable use of this legal defense strategy was by former South African president Jacob Zuma in attempting to avoid giving testimony before the Zondo Commission into state corruption. Zuma used a number of legal challenges, medical delays, private prosecutions, and other means to attempt to cause the commission to run out of time before he would have to appear before it.

References 

Criminal defenses
Informal legal terminology
English phrases